Guardia is a surname. Notable people with the surname include:

Gloria Guardia (1940–2019), Panamanian novelist
Guillermo Guardia (born 1960), Costa Rican footballer
Jaime Guardia (1933–2018), Peruvian singer
Maribel Guardia (born 1959), Costa Rican actress
Rómulo Guardia (born 1961), Venezuelan film producer
Tomás Guardia Gutiérrez (1831–1882), Costa Rican politician
Victoria Guardia Alvarado (born 1939), Costa Rican politician

Spanish-language surnames